Gunn v. Minton, 568 U.S. 251 (2013), is a US patent law case. The case dealt with the question of jurisdiction of patent law litigation in regard to attorney malpractice.  In a unanimous ruling, the United States Supreme Court decided that federal laws granting exclusive jurisdiction to cases involving patents does not preclude the ability of state courts to hear cases related to but not involving patents.  The case was remanded to the Texas state courts for further proceedings.

References

External links
 

2013 in United States case law
United States patent case law
United States Supreme Court cases of the Roberts Court
United States Supreme Court cases